Charles Fiterman (born 28 December 1933) is a French politician. He served as Minister of Transport from 1981 to 1984, under former President François Mitterrand. He was originally a high-ranking member of the French Communist Party, but joined the Socialist Party in 1998. In 2017, he announced in Le Monde that he had left the Socialist Party.

Bibliography
Profession de foi: pour l'honneur de la politique (2005)

References

1933 births
Living people
Politicians from Saint-Étienne
Government ministers of France
French Communist Party politicians
Transport ministers of France